Dragan Radosavljević (Serbian Cyrillic: Драган Радосављевић; born 24 October 1982) is a Serbian former professional footballer who played as a left-back.

Club career
Born in Smederevo, Radosavljević came through the youth ranks at his hometown club Sartid Smederevo, before breaking into the first team in 2000. He immediately became an irreplaceable part of the team on the left side of the pitch. His impressive displays caught the attention of numerous domestic and foreign clubs, including bids from Ajax and Dynamo Kyiv, but the transfer never went through. In total, Radosavljević played six seasons for the club, making 124 league appearances and scoring 10 goals. He also represented the club in UEFA competitions, making 14 appearances while scoring once.

In June 2006, Radosavljević signed a four-year contract with Partizan. He spent six months at the club, before being loaned to Bežanija in February 2007. In the following summer, Radosavljević was sent on a season-long loan to his parent club Smederevo.

Between 2008 and 2011, Radosavljević went on to play for Banat Zrenjanin, Sevojno and Sloboda Užice, but without notable achievements.

After spending one season with Cypriot club Aris Limassol, Radosavljević moved back to his homeland and signed with Radnički Kragujevac in July 2012. He stayed there for only six months, before again returning to Smederevo.

International career
Radosavljević represented FR Yugoslavia at Under-18 and Under-21 level. He also played for the national B team in a friendly match against the Czech Republic national under-21 team in September 2002.

Statistics

Honours
Sartid Smederevo
 Serbia and Montenegro Cup: 2002–03

References

External links
 
 
 

Aris Limassol FC players
Association football defenders
Cypriot First Division players
Expatriate footballers in Cyprus
First League of Serbia and Montenegro players
FK Banat Zrenjanin players
FK Bežanija players
FK Partizan players
FK Radnički 1923 players
FK Sevojno players
FK Sloboda Užice players
FK Smederevo players
FK Sopot players
Serbia and Montenegro under-21 international footballers
Serbian expatriate footballers
Serbian expatriate sportspeople in Cyprus
Serbian First League players
Serbian footballers
Serbian SuperLiga players
Sportspeople from Smederevo
1982 births
Living people